Spyridium stenophyllum is a species of flowering plant in the family Rhamnaceae and is endemic to the south of South Australia. It is a sticky shrub with narrowly Y-shaped leaves, and heads of white to cream-coloured flowers surrounded by densely felty-hairy floral leaves.

Description
The edges of the leaves are turned down or rolled under, the lower surface densely covered with star-shaped hairs.

Taxonomy
This species was first formally described in 1858 by Siegfried Reissek who gave it the name Trymalium stenophyllum in the journal Linnaea from specimens collected by Johann Friedrich Carl Wilhelmi at "Point Boston". In 2012, Jürgen Kellermann and William Robert Barker changed the name to Spyridium stenophyllum in the journal Muelleria. The specific epithet (stenophyllum) means "narrow-leaved".

In the same journal article, Kellermann and Barker described two subspecies of S. stenophyllum, and the names are accepted by the Australian Plant Census:
 Spyridium stenophyllum subsp. renovatum Kellermann & W.R.Barker has leaves with upwards-pointing hairs on the upper surface, the tip of the leaves curved downwards, and flowers from September to November.
 Spyridium stenophyllum (Reissek) Kellermann & W.R.Barker subsp. stenophyllum has leaves with a glabrous upper surface, the tip of the leaves hidden by a tuft of hairs, and mainly flowers from July to October.

Distribution and habitat
Spyridium stenophyllum grows on sand dunes and in mallee vegetation in southern South Australia. Subspecies renovatum mainly occurs on the Eyre Peninsula and parts of the Flinders Ranges and subsp. stenophyllum is distributed around Arno Bay, along the east coast of the Eyre Peninsula, and in scattered place further inland.

References

stenophyllum
Rosales of Australia
Flora of South Australia
Plants described in 1858